The IBM Data Warehousing Balanced Configuration Unit is a family of data warehousing servers from IBM. IBM introduced the Balanced Configuration Unit (BCU) for AIX in 2005, and the BCU for Linux in 2006.  The BCU is a "balanced" combination of computer server hardware (cpus, I/O channels, and storage) combined with DB2 Data Warehouse Edition (DB2 DWE) software to form a data warehouse "appliance like" system to compete with systems such as Greenplum, DATAllegro, Netezza Performance Server, and Teradata. 

See also IBM Linux Solution Optimizes Enterprise Data Warehousing.

External links
 IBM's InfoSphere Balanced Warehouse web page: 

Balanced